Playforia was an online game community created by Finnish game studio Playforia Inc. in 2002. It was one of the most popular online game services in Finland where it is known as aapeli.com. The service was available in various languages and offered a variety of Flash and Java-based browser games. As of the end of 2018, Playforia announced to close its web presence on January 7, 2019.

Their final words were:

"As of January 7, Playforia is moving onto greener pastures. Thank you for the amazing experience and all the beautiful memories. May we meet again!

Kind regards,

Sparky and the Playforia Team"

References

Browser-based game websites
2002 establishments in Finland